Parri Bangla is a village situated 28 km from Gilgit city and 23 km from Juglot town, Parri Bangla was established in 1885 by the residents of Juglot Sai and Balas. In 1929, . The first Development was a Dak Bangla on the Silk Route of the village during the period of British Colonial Rule. Locally Dak Bangla means "Post House". A water channel from Chakarkot Nala was constructed in 1931 by the locals of the village.

The population of Parri Bangla consists of Pakhtuns, Kashmiris, Sheens, Yashkuns, Dom, Kamin, Akhars etc.

External links
Parri-Bangla Satellite image at wikimapia.org
Parri-Bangla
KKH
Populated places in Gilgit District